Martin Vihmann (born 23 August 1981) is an Estonian athletics competitor.

In 2009 he graduated from Tallinn University of Technology.

He began athletics training in 1997, coached by Ando and Katrin Palginõmm. 1999–2005 his coach was Valter Espe. In 2003 he won a bronze medal at the 2003 Summer Universiade in 4 × 100 metres relay. He is multiple-times Estonian champion in different running disciplines. 2001–2008 he was a member of Estonian national athletics team.

Besides athletics, he has also been successful in rally driving. 2016–2019 he won 4 medals at Estonian championships.

Personal best:
100 m 10,62 (2002)
 200 m 21,05 (2005)
 400 m 46,99 (2004)

References

Living people
1981 births
Estonian male sprinters
Tallinn University of Technology alumni
Universiade medalists in athletics (track and field)
Universiade bronze medalists for Estonia
Medalists at the 2003 Summer Universiade